There are at least 16 members of the spurge genus (Euphorbia) found in Montana. Some of these species are exotics (not native to Montana).

Euphorbia agraria, urban spurge
Euphorbia brachycera, horned spurge
Euphorbia cyparissias, cypress spurge
Euphorbia esula, leafy spurge
Euphorbia geyeri, Geyer's spurge
Euphorbia glyptosperma, corrugate-seed broomspurge
Euphorbia helioscopia, summer spurge
Euphorbia hexagona, six-angle spurge
Euphorbia marginata, snow-on-the-mountain
Euphorbia missurica, prairie broomspurge
Euphorbia oblongata, eggleaf spurge
Euphorbia peplus, petty spurge
Euphorbia serpens, matted broomspurge
Euphorbia serpyllifolia, thyme-leaf broomspurge
Euphorbia spathulata, reticulate-seeded spurge
Euphorbia supina, spotted spurge

Further reading

See also
 List of dicotyledons of Montana

Notes

Montana
Montana